Diamonds  is one of the four suits of playing cards in the standard French deck. It is the only French suit to not have been adapted from the German deck, taking the place of the suit of Bells .

The original French name of the suit is Carreau; in German it is known as Karo.

In older German-language accounts of card games, Diamonds are frequently referred to as Eckstein ("cornerstone"). In Switzerland, the suit is still called Egge (=Ecke i.e. "corner") today. The term "Karo" went into the German language in the 18th century from the French carreau, which goes back to the Latin word, quadrum, meaning "square" or "rectangle".

Characteristics 

The diamond typically has a lozenge shape, a parallelogram with four equal sides, placed on one of its points. The sides are sometimes slightly rounded and the four vertices placed in a square, making the sign look like an astroid.

Normally diamonds are red in colour. They can however be depicted in blue, which is the case for example in bridge (where it is one of the two minor suits along with Clubs). In the official Skat tournament deck, diamonds are yellow or orange, assuming the color of their German-deck equivalent, which are usually golden.

The following gallery shows the diamonds from a 52-card deck of French playing cards. Not shown is the Knight of Diamonds used in the tarot card games:

Four-colour packs 

Four-colour packs are sometimes used in tournaments or online. In such packs Diamonds may be:
 orange  in English and German packs
 yellow  in American decks and German Skat tournament packs or 
 blue  in English and American Poker decks, French and Swiss four-colour packs.

Coding 
The symbol ♦ is already in the CP437 and therefore also part of Windows WGL4. In Unicode a black ♦ and a white ♢ diamond have been defined:

References

Literature

External links 

Card suits

da:Ruder